Ying Chu Lin (Susan) Wu (July 26, 1932 - May 19, 2020) was a Chinese-born American businesswoman and engineer in magnetohydrodynamics, aeronautics, and aerospace engineering.

Education and career
Wu was born in Peking, China studied mechanical engineering at National Taiwan University, and earned a B.S. in 1955. She moved to the United States in 1957 and earned an M.S. from Ohio State University in 1959 before moving to the California Institute of Technology (Caltech), where she became the first woman to earn a Ph.D. in aeronautics in 1963. Wu worked at Electro-Optics Corporation for two years. In 1965 she joined the faculty at the University of Tennessee Space Institute where she was promoted to professor in 1973. In 1988 when she founded ERC, Engineering Research and Consulting, a company working in the defense and space industry.

Wu's research centered on magnetohydrodynamic generators. She served on the National Air and Space Museum Advisory Board from 1993 to 2000, and spoke to the United States House of Representatives about  magnetohydrodynamic generators.

Awards and honors 
Wu received an Amelia Earhart fellowship from Zonta International in 1960 while working on her Ph.D. degree. In 1985 she received the Society of Women Engineers Achievement Award. In 1996, Wu was recognized by the American Institute of Aeronautics and Astronautics, where she was an associate fellow, for her work which led to space weather prediction. In 2013 Wu received a distinguished alumni award from Caltech.

Selected publications

References

External links 
ERC, Engineering Research and Consulting, Inc.

1932 births
2020 deaths
California Institute of Technology alumni
Ohio State University alumni
University of Tennessee faculty
20th-century American businesswomen
20th-century American businesspeople